The XM1216 Small Unmanned Ground Vehicle (SUGV) is a Future Combat Systems specific, man packable (< ) version of the iRobot's PackBot.

Description
The XM1216 Small Unmanned Ground Vehicle (SUGV) is a lightweight, man portable Unmanned Ground Vehicle (UGV) capable of conducting military operations in urban terrain, tunnels, sewers, and caves. The SUGV aids in the performance of manpower-intensive or high-risk functions (i.e. urban Intelligence, Surveillance, and Reconnaissance (ISR) missions, chemical/Toxic Industrial Chemicals (TIC), Toxic Industrial Materials (TIM), reconnaissance, etc.).

Working to minimize Soldiers' exposure directly to hazards, the SUGV's modular design allows multiple payloads to be integrated in a plug and play fashion.

The XM1216 can either be remotely manned, or manipulated through use of a Microsoft Xbox 360  gamepad fitted with speciality drivers. This allows full control of the unit, otherwise unavailable through a conventional joystick. Alternatively a ruggedized controller known as Small HaWC (HArm's Way Controller), more suited to combat environments may be used in place of the Xbox 360 controller.

The SUGV is part of Spin Out 1 and has entered evaluation at the Army Evaluation Task Force (AETF). It will be fielded to IBCTs starting in 2011.

In February 2012, the Army announced their intention to issue a sole-source contract to iRobot for the XM1216 Small Unmanned Ground Vehicle (SUGV) Robotic System.  The contract is for developing, supporting, and testing hardware and software related to the XM1216.

In August 2015, the U.S. Marine Corps ordered 75 SUGVs.

Gallery

References
Notes

Sources
US Army site : SUGV

External links

Army Unveils High-Tech Future Combat Systems
Visit to iRobot and hands on with SUGV The Sunday Times 31 May 2009, Mark Harris

Unmanned ground vehicles
Military equipment of the United States
Military robots
IRobot
2000s robots
Tracked robots
Military vehicles introduced in the 2000s